The following is a list of most watched United States television broadcasts of 1989 (single-network only) according to Nielsen.

Most watched by week

References

Most watched 1989
Most watched